Rokon may refer to:

 Rokon, South Sudan, a city in Central Equatoria
 Rokon, a Rochester, New Hampshire-based motorcycle manufacturer
 Al Sahariar, a cricketer also known as Rokon
 a street in Saint Lawrence, Malta